Sir Roger Beauchamp of Bletsoe was the son and heir presumptive of his father Sir Roger, 1st Baron Beauchamp of Bletsoe who was one of Edward III’s leading courtiers and had been summoned to Parliament as Lord Beauchamp of Bletsoe.

The younger Sir Roger died vita patris (c. 1373), perhaps while fighting in France as a retainer of John of Gaunt. His father took personal charge of his young son, also Roger (b. 1362), who later became de jure 2nd Baron Beauchamp of Bletso.

Through his descendant and great granddaughter, Margaret Beauchamp, he was an ancestor of Henry VII.

References

Year of birth missing
1373 deaths
Roger
Eldest sons of British hereditary barons
Heirs apparent who never acceded